Margaret J. Burton Cahill (born March 8, 1954) is an American Democratic politician. She has served as Arizona State Senator for District 17 until 2011. Earlier she was a member of the Arizona House of Representatives from 2000 through 2006.

Cahill is currently running for Justice of the Peace in the University Lakes Justice Precinct.

References

External links

Senator Meg Burton Cahill – District 17 Official State Senate website
Profile at Project Vote Smart
Follow the Money – Meg Burton Cahill
2008 2006 State Senate campaign contributions
2004 2002 2000 State House campaign contributions

1954 births
Living people
Democratic Party Arizona state senators
Democratic Party members of the Arizona House of Representatives
Women state legislators in Arizona